The chestnut-vented nuthatch (Sitta nagaensis) is a species of bird in the nuthatch family Sittidae. The  are a solid gray blue, with a markedly black loral stripe. The  are uniform gray to buff from the throat to belly, with brick red on the flanks. The undertail is white with a rufous border. The chestnut-vented nuthatch utters different kinds of calls, which can sometimes sound like a troglodyte alarm, and its song is a monotonous, stereotypical crackle, typically . Its ecology is poorly known, but it probably feeds on small arthropods and seeds, and the breeding season begins between March and May. The nest is typically located in a hole in the trunk of a tree, and the clutch has two to five eggs.

Chestnut-vented nuthatches are found in the northeast of India, in parts of Tibet and south-central China, descending into eastern Myanmar and northwestern Thailand. Isolated populations also live in southern Laos and Vietnam. It mainly lives in evergreen forests or pine forests, but can also live in mixed or deciduous forests. Its natural habitats are subtropical or tropical moist lowland forests and subtropical or tropical moist montane forests. The species was described in 1874 by the British naturalist Henry Haversham Godwin-Austen, who named it Sitta nagaensis in reference to the Naga Hills, where the type material was collected. It belongs to the europaea group of species, including the Kashmir nuthatch (S. cashmirensis) and the Eurasian nuthatch (S. europaea)—all of which build the entrance to their nests. The numbers of the species are not estimated but appear to be declining. However, the bird's range is relatively wide, and the International Union for the Conservation of Nature considers the species of least concern.

Taxonomy 
The chestnut-vented nuthatch was described as Sitta nagaensis in 1874 by the British naturalist Henry Haversham Godwin-Austen. Its species name is composed of naga and the Latin suffix -ensis, "that lives in, that inhabits," was given in reference to the area when the type of the species was collected, the Naga Hills. The chestnut-vented nuthatch is placed in the rarely-used subgenus Sitta (Linnaeus, 1758). 

In 2014, Eric Pasquet and colleagues published a phylogeny based on examination of nuclear and mitochondrial DNA of 21 nuthatch species. The europaea group is related to the two nuthatches that live in rocky environments, the western rock nuthatch (S. neumayer) and the eastern rock nuthatch (S. tephronota). Within the europaea group, the white-tailed nuthatch (S. himalayensis) and therefore probably the white-browed nuthatch (S. victoriae), which closely resembles it in terms of its morphology, although it was not included in the study, appear to be basal, and the chestnut-vented nuthatch is closely related to the Eurasian nuthatch (S. europaea) and the Kashmir nuthatch (S. cashmirensis).

Subspecies 
There are three recognized subspecies of the chestnut-vented nuthatch. 

 S. n. montium (La Touche, 1899), described as a mountain shape by Irish ornithologist John La Touche as protonym of Sitta montium, lives in eastern Tibet, southern and eastern China, Myanmar, and northwest Thailand.
 S. n. nagaensis (Godwin-Austen, 1874), lives in northeast India and western Myanmar.
 S. n. grisiventris (Kinnear, 1920), originally described under the protonym Sitta europaea grisiventris since S. n. nagaesis was itself considered a subspecies of the Eurasian nuthatch (S. europaea), it lives in southwest Myanmar and southern Laos and Vietnam.
The subspecies S. n. montium was considered to possibly be the result of hybridization between the chestnut-vented nuthatch and Sitta europaea sinensis, or at least to be able to interbreed with it. This is possibly due to the fact that the type series of S. e. sinensis was composite and included a specimen of the chestnut-vented nuthatch. For these reasons, Jean-François Voisin and colleagues designated a lectotype in 2002 for the name Sitta sinensis (Verreaux, 1871). The attribution of the populations of southwestern Myanmar and southern Indochina to the same subspecies, S. n. grisiventris with S. n. nagaensis interspersed between these populations in western Myanmar seems untenable and their taxonomy has yet to be verified.

Description

Plumage and measurements 

The  are a solid blue-gray from crown to tail, with a marked black loral line extending to the base of the wing. The  are pale gray, more or less tinted buff-tinged depending on the subspecies or the wear of the plumage; the dark brick-red back flanks contrast strongly with the rest of the underparts. The , which may be of the same color depending on the subspecies, have a large white border at the end of the feathers or a white patch near the tip.

The species does not show marked sexual dimorphism. The male's rear flanks are deep brick-red, deeper and less orange than the undertail coverts, whereas the female's flanks are rufous, concolorous with the undertail coverts. Females also have duller underparts, and juveniles are more buff than adults with worn plumage. The iris is brown to dark brown, the bill is grayish-black to blackish with the base of the lower mandible (and sometimes the base of the upper) slate-gray or blue-gray. The legs are dark brown, greenish or blue-gray, with almost black claws.

Three subspecies are recognized, but variations are essentially clinal, with Chinese populations (S. n. montium) having buff underparts, which get duller and purer gray as they move southward in the species' distribution. In Northeast India and western Myanmar, S. n. nagaensis in fresh plumage is as buff as S. n. montium in worn plumage. In southern Vietnam and southwestern Myanmar, S. n. grisiventris has purer gray underparts than S. n. nagaensis. Adults undergo a complete moult after the breeding season, from May to June, and an incomplete moult occurs before it.

Similar species 

The range of the chestnut-vented nuthatch overlaps with that of the Burmese nuthatch (S. neglecta). However, the chestnut-vented nuthatch is easily distinguished by the color of its underparts, and the lack of contrast between the sides of the head and the throat, whereas the other species has white chins, cheeks, and parotid region contrasting with brick-red to orange-brown underparts. However, in the chestnut-vented nuthatch, some individuals in fresh plumage (especially in S. n. montium) may have underparts almost as buff as some Burmese nuthatch females or juveniles. The chestnut-vented nuthatch can then be recognized by its darker, duller blue upperparts, by its red flanks contrasting with the buff, and by its undertail, with feathers edged with red giving a "scales" pattern, when they appear almost uniformly white in the Burmese nuthatch.

The subspecies S. n. montium can also be confused with the subspecies S. e. sinensis of the Eurasian nuthatch (S. europaea) where they coexist in Sichuan and Fujian. If the latter species has more orange underparts, some Eurasian females may be difficult to differentiate from chestnut-vented nuthatches in fresh plumage. The two species can be distinguished by their vocalizations, with chestnut-vented nuthatch lacking the characteristic singing dwip of the Euraisan nuthatch. Hybrids between these two taxa have been hypothesized, with montane populations of S. e. sinensis being, like the chestnut-vented nuthatch, grayer on the underside, darker above, and larger than lowland individuals. The chestnut-vented nuthatch, however, is even grayer, and does not have the whitish cheeks of the Eurasian nuthatch.

In southwest China, the chestnut-vented nuthatch lives within the range of the Yunnan nuthatch (S. yunnanensis). However, the latter is smaller, has a thin white supercilium, and has plain, pale buff underparts with no russet on the flanks. In northeastern India and northwestern Myanmar, the chestnut-vented nuthatch may be confused with the white-tailed nuthatch (S. himalayensis), the both species inhabit similar habitats. The white-tailed nuthatch, however, has a white spot on the top of the middle rectrices, and has more orange underparts, without brick-red flanks or white spots on the undertail.

Ecology and behavior 

The chestnut-vented nuthatch generally surveys alone or in pairs, or forms mixed-species foraging flocks outside of the breeding season. In winter, it can thus be observed in the company of different species of tits (Paridae) such as the yellow-cheeked tit (Maclolophus spilonotus), or Aegithalidae, woodpeckers, alcippes, and minlas.

Vocalizations 

The chestnut-vented nuthatch's calls are varied, with squeaky sit or sit-sit sounds, repeated more or less rapidly with various inflections and in irregular series. Similar but drier  or  sounds are sometimes made, often in a trill reminiscent of the alarm of the winter wren (Troglodytes hiemalis). The song is a stereotyped, monotonous rattle or tremolo in  ... or  ..., lasting less than a second or sometimes slowed down to  ... or  reminiscent of the song of the Eurasian nuthatch.

Food 
The chestnut-vented nuthatch often forages for food on the ground, on rocks, old stumps, or on trees. No specific information about the diet is known, but the species probably feeds on small arthropods and seeds.

Breeding 
Although the breeding season varies by region, it generally takes place in Thailand from March to May, March to June for India, April to early June for eastern Myanmar, and April to May in Fujian. On Nat Ma Taung, juveniles have been observed as early as March 31. According to observations made in Thailand and Vietnam, the construction of the nest begins in January.

The chestnut-vented nuthatch, like the Eurasian nuthatch and other species of the family, may line the entrance of a cavity with mud to reduce the opening and thus avoid predation of the brood. The bottom of the nest is lined with pieces of bark and moss and topped with hair. They are white, with red dots on a mottled reddish-purple background, and are mainly concentrated at the larger end of the egg.

Distribution and habitat
The chestnut-vented nuthatch lives from Tibet to the South Central Coast of Vietnam. In India, it is found only in the far eastern states of Arunachal Pradesh, Nagaland, Manipur, Assam and Meghalaya. The species lives in the Chin Hills of western Myanmar, but most of its distribution in Myanmar is in the eastern half of the country, from Kachin State to at least Shan State, spilling over into western Thailand. The species nests in Tibet and south-central China, from western Sichuan to Yunnan and marginally in southwestern Guizhou. An isolated Chinese population also lives in northwestern Fujian, on Mount Huanggang. Two other isolated populations from the southernmost part of the species' distribution, one occurring in southern Vietnam on the Đà Lạt Plateau, another being reported in Laos on the Bolaven Plateau. 

The chestnut-vented nuthatch usually inhabits evergreen forests of the uplands, or forests and pine patches growing on dry ridges in the middle of evergreen forests. Locally, it also occurs in deciduous forests in northeastern India, in Quercus subsericea oak forests and alder groves in northeastern Myanmar, spruce forests (Picea sp.), fir forests (Abies sp.) or rhododendron stands in Yunnan, or poplar (Populus sp.) and walnut (Juglans sp.) in Sichuan.

Status and threats 
The population of the chestnut-vented nuthatch is declining due to habitat destruction and fragmentation, but its range is large and was estimated to be 3.8 million km2 (1.5 million square miles), and the species is generally common throughout its range. For these reasons, the chestnut-vented nuthatch is considered to be of least concern by the International Union for the Conservation of Nature. A study carried out in 2009 tried to predict the impact of climate change on the distribution of several species of nuthatches in Asia by modeling two scenarios. It predicted that the chestnut-vented nuthatch could see its distribution decrease between the 2040s and 2069 by 15.9 to 17.4%.

Footnotes

References

chestnut-vented nuthatch
Birds of Myanmar
Birds of Yunnan
chestnut-vented nuthatch
Taxonomy articles created by Polbot